Tournée Européenne 2013 was the tenth concert tour by Canadian singer Celine Dion. The tour was organized to support the highly successful fourteenth French-language and twenty-fourth studio album Sans attendre (2012), which has sold more than 1.5 million copies worldwide. It was Dion's first dedicated Francophone tour since the D'eux Tour in 1995–1996. With only ten concerts performed, it was also the shortest tour of Dion's career. Overall, the tour grossed an estimated $20 million from nine shows in Europe. The tour would also mark as the final concert tour for the majority of Dion's longtime touring band members consisting of musical director Claude "Mego" Lemay, guitarist André Coutu, keyboardist Yves Frulla, bassist Marc Langais, and violinist Jean-Seb Carré.

Background
According to producer Gilbert Coullier, speaking on France Bleu 107.1, The European 'mini-tour' was originally planned to cover both the Francophone and Anglophone markets (including the UK and Germany), allowing Dion to promote her latest French and English releases simultaneously. However, due to the postponement of the English album, the Anglophone section of the tour was cancelled. The Francophone part of the tour went ahead as planned, celebrating the highly successful 2012 album Sans attendre in Belgium and France.

On 19 June 2013, a sixth show in Paris was announced, to take place on 4 December 2013. On 27 August 2013, a seventh show in Paris was announced, to take place on 5 December 2013. This brings the total number of concerts in the tour to nine.

The tour saw Dion perform two shows in Antwerp, Belgium, and five sold-out shows in Paris, France. The setlist was very similar to that of Celine... une seule fois, a special one-off outdoor show in Quebec during the summer of 2013 (see below). However, there were some changes made to the show in preparation for the European concerts. The songs "Je n'ai pas besoin d'amour", "L'amour existe encore", and the Luc Plamondon medley of "Je danse dans ma tête/Des mots qui sonnent" and "Incognito" were not performed. However, certain songs were added to the European setlist. Two additional new English-language songs, "Water and a Flame" and "At Seventeen", were added at the start of the tour, as well as Dion's first English-language hit from 1990, "Where Does My Heart Beat Now". Two rarely performed French singles, "Tout l'or des hommes" and "Immensité", were also included. The song "Regarde-moi", although planned for the Quebec show but never performed, was finally added to the setlist for the Paris shows, marking the first time it had been performed on stage since the Millennium Concert. "Un garçon pas comme les autres (Ziggy)" was also performed in France, repeating the same setlist differences seen during the Taking Chances World Tour, with "L'amour existe encore" only being performed in Quebec, and "Ziggy" only being performed in Europe.

Dion also wore the same outfits in Europe as she did in Quebec during Celine... une seule fois. However, in Europe, the dress worn for "My Heart Will Go On" was different, and it was worn until the very end of the show. Therefore, the white outfit with the long, gold jacket worn in Quebec was never featured in the European shows.

Broadcasts and recordings
All shows were professionally filmed. On 1 December 2013 "Dans un autre monde", "Parler à mon père", and "Loved Me Back to Life" were broadcast on Herby.tv. These songs were filmed on 29 November 2013. Various excerpts from the concert of 5 December 2013 can be found on L'ete Indien. There are no current plans for a DVD release, most likely since the "Celine...Une Seule Fois" concert was released on DVD.

Céline... une seule fois was recorded professionally by Dion's recording company and was shown on Quebec pay-to-view channels from 10 August 2013. The concert  was also broadcast on several European channels: RTS Deux in Switzerland on 24 December 2013, D8 in France on 25 December 2013 and La Une in Belgium on 31 December 2013.

On 19 May 2014, a live DVD/2-CD set was released, entitled Céline... une seule fois / Live 2013. The set includes the entire Quebec show plus 4 extra songs recorded on 26 November 2013 in Paris. Bonus
audio tracks include: "Tout l'or des hommes", "Un garçon pas comme les autres (Ziggy)", "Water and a Flame" and "Regarde-moi" as a bonus. Unfortunately,  "Where Does My Heart Beat Now", "At Seventeen", "Je ne vous oublie pas" and "Immensité" were omitted. Thus, there are no official audio nor video performances of these songs.

Céline... une seule fois
Although not officially a part of the Sans attendre Tour, Dion performed for one night only in front of 42,495 spectators in Quebec City on the Plains of Abraham, on 27 July 2013. Céline... une seule fois marked Dion's second official public concert outside of Las Vegas since her second residency began in March 2011; the first was in 2012 at the Jamaica Jazz and Blues Festival. This also marked her second show on the Plains of Abraham, the first being Céline sur les Plaines in 2008, celebrating Quebec's 400th Anniversary. Unlike the 2008 show, there were no special guests, meaning the show focused on Dion and her repertoire. It was also reported that the show would feature a setlist containing 80% French and 20% English songs (a ratio not seen since the D'eux Tour), with songs from Incognito (1987) through to Sans attendre (2012).

On 24 May 2013, the setlist for the show was revealed. The setlist included six new songs from the album Sans attendre, as well as six songs that had not been performed since either the  Millennium Concert or the Let's Talk About Love Tour in 1999. The rest of the setlist featured the same French songs previously performed in the 2008-2009 Taking Chances World Tour (with the exception of "Et s'il n'en restait qu'une (je serais celle-là)"), as well as English selections from Dion's current Las Vegas show, Celine. Despite the reports claiming the setlist would cover Dion's entire French career, there were no songs from the albums 1 fille & 4 types or D'elles. New recordings from the 2005 greatest hits compilation, On ne change pas, were also not included, meaning there was no material from the decade 2000–2009.

At a press conference before the show, it was reported that the European Sans attendre Tour concerts in November and December 2013 would feature a similar setlist to Céline... une seule fois.

The actual setlist performed in Quebec differed slightly to the one published before the event. "Ce n'était qu'un rêve" was performed a cappella as an introduction, and the title track from Dion's upcoming English album, "Loved Me Back to Life", was also added at the end of the show. "J'irai où tu iras" was performed earlier than initially planned, and the song "Bozo" was performed after this. Out of respect for the victims of the recent Lac-Mégantic derailment, the song "Regarde-moi" was not performed, as its lyrics refer to a train going out of control. "Rolling in the Deep" and "The Prayer" were  not performed either.

 Introduction: "Ce n'était qu'un rêve" (Performed a cappella)
 "Dans un autre monde" 
 "Parler à mon père" 
 Medley: "It's All Coming Back to Me Now/The Power of Love"
 "On ne change pas" 
 "Destin" 
 "Qui peut vivre sans amour?" 
 "Je crois toi" 
 "La mer et l'enfant" 
 "Celle qui m'a tout appris"
 "Terre" 
 "J'irai où tu iras" (Duet with Jean-Marc Couture)
 "Bozo"
 "Je n'ai pas besoin d'amour" 
 "S'il suffisait d'aimer" 
 "L'amour existe encore" 
 "All by Myself"
 "Je sais pas" 
 Medley: "Je danse dans ma tête/Des mots qui sonnent/Incognito" 
 Medley: "Love Can Move Mountains/River Deep, Mountain High"
 "My Heart Will Go On"
 "Pour que tu m'aimes encore" 
 "Loved Me Back to Life"
 "Le miracle" 

Boxscore

Opening acts
Jean-Marc Couture (Quebec)

Vincent Niclo (Belgium and France)

Set list

Shows

Band
 Musical Director, Piano: Claude "Mégo" Lemay
 Drums: Dominique Messier
 Bass: Marc Langis
 Guitars: André Coutu
 Keyboards: Yves Frulla
 Percussion: Paul Picard
 Background Vocals, Cello & Tin Whistle: Élise Duguay
 Background Vocals: Barnev Valsaint, Dawn Cumberbatch
 Violin: Jean Sebastien Carré
 Cello: Julie McInnes
 Woodwinds: Eric Tewalt, Philip Wigfall
 Trumpets: Matt Fronke, Kurt Evanson, Nico Edgerman, Donald Lorice
 Trombones: Daniel Falcone, Nathan Tanouye

References

2013 concert tours
Celine Dion concert tours